USS Canopus (AS-34) was a Simon Lake-class submarine tender of the United States Navy, operational from 1965 to 1994. The vessel was used to repair and refit submarine-launched Polaris nuclear-armed ballistic missiles and the submarines that deployed with them. The vessel primarily served US naval bases on the US Atlantic Coast and in Europe. In 1969, the ship was overhauled to maintain the new Poseidon Missile Systems. Taken out of service in 1995, the US Navy's intent to have the ship broken up for scrap in the United Kingdom was controversial. By 2010 demolition had been completed.

Construction 
Canopuss keel was laid on 2 March 1964 and she was launched on 12 February 1965, at Ingalls Shipbuilding Corporation in Pascagoula, Mississippi. Canopus was completed and delivered to the Navy in record breaking time on 25 October 1965.

Canopus joined Submarine Squadron 18 at Charleston and was commissioned on 4 November 1965. After a short outfitting period, Canopus sailed for the Caribbean on 7 January 1966. Canopus visited Guantánamo Bay, Cuba, for shakedown training. She returned to Charleston Naval Shipyard on 24 February for the usual post-shakedown work.

In mid-April 1966, Canopus completed her acceptance trials and upon final loading and outfitting deployed to the Cooper River FBM Replenishment Site on 24 June. Canopus started refitting submarines of Squadron 18.

Service history

1960s
On 24 September 1966, Canopus deployed from Charleston, South Carolina, arriving in Rota, Spain, on 10 October. Canopus relieved  and reported to the Commander of Submarine Squadron 16 for duty. While at Rota, Canopus accomplished more Polaris refits than any other submarine tender in a comparable amount of time.

On 20 April 1969, Canopus was relieved by Holland and sailed for Bremerton, Washington, via the Panama Canal. In Bremerton, Canopus was extensively overhauled and thereby gained the title of the first submarine tender in the United States Navy capable of refitting and maintaining a submarine with the Poseidon Missile System.

1970s
After completion of this overhaul, Canopus sailed for Holy Loch, Scotland, via the Panama Canal. In May 1970, she relieved  at Holy Loch. She reported to the Commander of Submarine Squadron 14.

On 29 November 1970, a fire broke out in the CPO baggage room, killing three and injuring ten.  The fatalities (all from smoke inhalation) were two prisoners, and the guard who had freed them from the brig.

Canopus remained in Holy Loch until November 1975. During this time, Canopus was instrumental in establishing several new maintenance concepts while completing, on schedule, every submarine refit during the 67 months at Holy Loch. During the last year at Holy Loch, Canopus received numerous awards including the Ney Award for the best large mess afloat, the second consecutive Battle Efficiency "E", the CINCLANTFLT Golden Anchor Award for personnel retention, and the Navy Unit Commendation for her role in the first FBM Submarine Extended Refit Period.

In 1976, Canopus underwent an extensive refit at Charleston Naval Shipyard and returned to Guantanamo Bay, Cuba, for refresher training. Canopus returned to Rota, Spain, in December 1976.

As a result of the shipyard overhaul in Charleston, Canopus brought new and improved capabilities to Rota for the support of Submarine Squadron 16.

In June 1979, Canopus relieved Simon Lake at the Naval Weapons Station Charleston, South Carolina. Canopus now reported to the Commander of Squadron 18.

1980s
In March 1980, Canopus got underway and made a liberty cruise to Cape Canaveral, Florida.

In 1984 after being relieved by Holland, Canopus underwent an overhaul at Charleston Naval Shipyard - which lasted until 1985. Refresher training and shake-down was conducted out of Guantanamo Bay, Cuba. After a short stay at Charleston, Canopus sailed in July 1985 to Naval Submarine Base Kings Bay, Georgia, where she relieved Simon Lake - assuming upkeep and refit duties for the SSBNs of Subron 16.

Decommissioning 
Canopus was located at Kings Bay during the early 1990s. During a ceremony held at the Warrior Wharf there on 7 October 1994, Canopus 29 years of service was celebrated; and she was decommissioned from active service.

Plans to scrap the vessel in the United Kingdom ran into controversy in view of the risks posed by toxic chemicals and asbestos.

In 2010, scrapping of Canopus was completed at Able UK.

References

External links
 
 USS Canopus Association website
 Canopus ship photos website

Simon Lake-class submarine tenders
Submarine tenders
United States Navy
Submarine tenders of the United States Navy
Cold War auxiliary ships of the United States
1965 ships